Guzhu was a vassal state of the Shang and Zhou dynasties located in the vicinity of modern Tangshan, Hebei province. It was a Dongyi state and had close relations with King Tang of Shang. During the Western Zhou dynasty, the Lichi and Shanrong tribes rose up in the north-west and north-east respectively, causing concerns to Guzhu's southern neighbors: the states of Qi and Yan. In 664 BC, Guzhu, already weakened, its monarch was killed by a Qi-Yan coalition during an expedition against the Shanrong. In 660 BC, Qi and Yan annexed Guzhu finally.

Guzhu rulers

See also
Boyi and Shuqi
Zhongshan (state)
Shanrong

References

Shang dynasty
Ancient Chinese states
States and territories disestablished in the 7th century BC